Alternate reality games are a modern genre of gaming often consisting of an interactive, networked narrative that uses the real world as a platform and employs transmedia storytelling to deliver a story that may be altered by players' ideas or actions. Most of these games are either independently run or used as a viral marketing campaign by a company or brand.

Before 2001: Influences and precursors 

Due to factors like "the curtain", attempts to begin games with "stealth launches" that fulfill the TINAG (This Is Not a Game) aesthetic, and the restrictive non-disclosure agreements governing how much information may be revealed by the puppet masters of promotional games, the design process for many ARGs is often shrouded in secrecy, making it difficult to discern the extent to which they have been influenced by other works.  In addition, the cross-media nature of the form allows ARGs to incorporate elements of so many other art forms and works that attempting to identify them all would be a nearly impossible task far beyond the scope of this article.

Possible inspirations from fiction and other art forms

G. K. Chesterton's 1905 short story "The Tremendous Adventures of Major Brown" (part of a collection entitled The Club of Queer Trades) seems to predict the ARG concept, as does John Fowles's 1965 novel The Magus.  Ludic texts such as the popular Choose Your Own Adventure children's novels may also have provided some inspiration.

The plot of the British television drama serial The One Game, broadcast in 1988, was entirely based on the concept of the ARG (referred to as a "reality game" in the script).

William Gibson's novel Pattern Recognition includes a recognizable example of a modern ARG, although it was published after the development of the genre began in earnest.  Reader-influenced online fiction such as AOL's QuantumLink Serial provides a model that incorporates audience influence into the storytelling in a manner similar to that of ARGs, as do promotional online games like Wizards of the Coast's Webrunner games. Live action role-playing games (LARPs) are a major influence on the ARG concept, particularly those such as played by UCLA's Enigma group, the MIT Assassin's Guild, and Dead Earth Productions (a horror LARP company in the San Francisco Bay Area during the late 1980s to the mid-1990s), although most notably White Wolf's "Vampire: The Masquerade". LARPs have often extended into the real world, where players can encounter actors and clues that further a real-time gaming plot.

Other possible antecedents include performance art and other theatrical forms that attempt to break Bertolt Brecht's "fourth wall" and directly engage the audience.

Early examples of major ARGs or proto-ARGs prior to 2001

Ong's Hat/Incunabula was most likely started sometime around 1993, and also included most of the aforementioned design principles. Ong's Hat also incorporated elements of legend tripping into its design, as chronicled in a scholarly work titled "Legend-Tripping Online: Supernatural Folklore and the Search for Ong's Hat". Some scholars disagree on the classification of the Ong's Hat story.

In 1996, Wizards of the Coast launched a proto-alternate reality game called Webrunner: The Hidden Agenda to promote their game Netrunner. It cast players as hackers through seven puzzle-themed "gates" to get the secret data ("agenda"). The popular game was the first online game tied into a product release, making the front page of The New York Times technology section. A sequel, Webrunner II: The Forbidden Code, followed on to promote the release of the Proteus expansion of the game.

Dreadnot was a (non-commercial) ARG produced with a grant from the San Francisco Chronicle and published on sfgate.com in 1996. It included most of the aforementioned design principles. The game included working voice mail phone numbers for characters, clues in the source code, character email addresses, off-site websites, real locations in San Francisco, real people (including then-Mayor Willie Brown), and of course a fictional mystery.

In 1997, a year prior to the release of the Douglas Adams computer game Starship Titanic, The Digital Village launched a web site purporting to be that of an intergalactic travel agency called Starlight Travel, which in the game is the Starship Titanic parent company. The site combined copious amounts of Monty Python-esque writing (by Michael Bywater) with ARG-type interactivity. When a site visitor filled out a personal information form, including email address and "favorite frog" (from a convenient – and long – drop-down list), approximately one week later, a spam email for something other than Starlight Travel would arrive, and would include a reference to the specific frog the visitor had selected. Another example involved a series of three emails; the first called the reader's attention to a password-protected intranet for the Starlight Lines company, the second urged the reader to delete unread any future emails, as confidential information was being erroneously emailed, and the third revealed the confidential password for the restricted site: "1".

The marketing for the 1999 movie The Blair Witch Project resembled ARGs in many ways (and some of its makers went on to create the 2005 Audi promotional ARG The Art of the Heist), expanding the world of the movie online, adding backstory, and treating the fiction as reality through real-world media such as fliers and a fake documentary on the Sci-Fi Channel.  However, perhaps in part due to the subject material and the absence of overt metacommunications that this was fiction, it also resembles an internet hoax or attempt to create an urban legend.

Pervasive play games like the Go Game and the Nokia Game also incorporated many elements similar to ARGs (although they tended to lack the narrative element central to ARGs) and prefigured the public play components of large-scale corporate ARGs like I Love Bees, Art of the Heist and Last Call Poker.

Electronic Arts' Majestic was developed at roughly the same time as the Beast, although it launched after the Beast had concluded.  Featuring phone calls, emails and other media that involved players in a multiplatform narrative, the game was eventually cancelled due to lack of players.  Factors ranging from the fee required to play to Majestic's unfortunate timing and subject matter in relation to the September 11 attacks on the World Trade Center to the absence of the TINAG principle ( e.g. in-game phone calls were preceded by an announcement that they were part of the game) have been cited to explain its failure.

The Beast and its influence 

In 2001, in order to market the movie A.I.: Artificial Intelligence and a planned series of Microsoft computer games based on the film, Microsoft's creative director, Jordan Weisman, and another Microsoft game designer, Elan Lee, conceived of an elaborate murder mystery played out across hundreds of websites, email messages, faxes, fake ads, and voicemail messages.  They hired Sean Stewart, an award-winning science-fiction/fantasy author, to write the story.  The game, dubbed "the Citizen Kane of online entertainment" by Internet Life, was a runaway success  that involved over three million active participants  from all over the world during its run and would become the seminal example of the nascent ARG genre.  An early asset list for the project contained 666 files, prompting the game's puppetmasters to dub it "the Beast", a name which was later adopted by players.  A large and extremely active fan community called the Cloudmakers formed to analyze and participate in solving the game,  and the combined intellect, tenacity and engagement of the group soon forced the puppetmasters to create new subplots, devise new puzzles, and alter elements of the design to keep ahead of the player base.  Somewhat unusually for a computer-based game, the production engaged equal numbers of male and female participants, and drew players from a wide spectrum of age groups and backgrounds.

Influences on the development of the Beast

Due to the influence the Beast exerted over the form of later ARGs and the willingness of its creators to talk about its development, its sources of inspiration are both particularly relevant to the evolution of the modern ARG and somewhat more verifiable than other possible antecedents.  Elan Lee, one of its creative principals, cites the 1997 movie The Game as an inspiration, as well as the Beatles' "Paul is dead" hoax. Sean Stewart, another of the three principal designers, notes that designing and running an ARG bears some similarities to running an RPG, and the influence of that particular game form is further suggested by the fact that Jordan Weisman, the game's third main designer, was also the founder of leading RPG company FASA.  He also noted that the sort of "creative scavenging" behavior the Beast depended on has its antecedents outside the arts:  the Beast just "accidentally reinvented science as pop culture entertainment".

The player community

Although the Beast ran for only three months, it prompted the formation of a highly organized and intensely engaged community that remains active years after the game concluded.  Perhaps more significantly, it inspired a number of its participants to create games adapting and expanding the model, extending it from an anomalous one-time occurrence to a new genre of entertainment and allowing the community to grow even after the Beast itself concluded.  Members of the Cloudmakers group went on to form ARGN, the primary news source for the genre, and Unfiction, its central community hub, as well as designing the first successful and widely played indie ARGs, such as LockJaw and Metacortechs, and corporate efforts such as Perplex City.

2002–2003: Community and genre growth 

The years immediately after the Beast saw independent developers who had played it extend the form from a one-time occurrence to a new genre of gaming, and the formation of an ever-growing community devoted to playing, designing and discussing ARGs.

Grassroots development
Under the influence of the Beast and enthusiastic about the power of collaboration, several Cloudmakers came together with the idea that they could create a similar game.  The first effort to make an independent Beast-like game, Ravenwatchers, failed, but another team soon assembled and would meet with success.  With very little experience behind them, the group  managed, after nine months of development, to create a viable game that was soon seized upon eagerly by the Cloudmakers group and featured in Wired magazine.  As players of the Beast, members of the Lockjaw development team were extremely aware of the community playing the game and took steps to encourage the tight bonding of the player base through highly collaborative puzzles, weekly Euchre games, and the inclusion of player personas in the game.  While the numbers never rivaled those of The Beast, with absolutely no funding or promotion, the game proved both that it was possible for developers to create these games without corporate funding or promotion, and that there was interest in the ARG form beyond a one-time audience for a production on the Beast's scale.  Lockjaw marked the start of the ARG as a genre of gaming, rather than simply a one-time occurrence.

Shortly before Lockjaw's conclusion, players discovered a game that seemed to revolve around the movie Minority Report.  Despite speculation to the contrary, the game (known as Exocog) was not an official promotion for the film, but an experiment in interactive storytelling by Jim Miller.  Inspired by the independent Lockjaw effort, Dave Szulborski introduced ChangeAgents, a spinoff of EA's failed Majestic ARG, to the ARGN audience, then followed it with two additional installments.  During this time, Szulborski also created a successful grassroots game not based on the Majestic universe, called Chasing the Wish.  Just before the release of the third and the final Matrix movie, the team that developed Lockjaw launched Metacortechs, an ARG based on that universe.  The fan fiction effort was very successful, reached a larger and more active player base than many professionally produced games, and was at first assumed by many to be an officially sanctioned promotion for the movie.  Metacortechs was followed by an ever-increasing number of grassroots ARGs.

In the wake of these successful, low-budget independent ARGs, an active "grassroots" development community began to evolve within the genre. While the quality of the grassroots games continues to vary wildly, amateur storytellers, web designers, and puzzle creators continue to provide independently developed ARGs for the active player community.

Community development

The term Alternate Reality Gaming was first used by Sean Stacey, one of the moderators of the Lockjaw player community, in the Trail for the game.  Stacey and Steve Peters, another of the moderators, created the two websites that have become the central hub of the ARG community: ARGN and UnFiction. Due to their efforts, when Lockjaw ended, the players had a new community resource allowing them to assemble to play the games that were soon to follow.  Unfiction now boasts over 13,000 members, and ARGN employs a staff of 15 volunteer writers to report on new games and other topics of interest to the community, and produces a weekly netcast.

2004–2006: Massive-scale commercial games and mainstream attention 

After the success of the first major entries in the nascent ARG genre, a number of large corporations looked to ARGs to promote both their products, and to add their companies' images by demonstrating their interest in innovative and fan-friendly marketing methods.  To create buzz for the launch of the Xbox game Halo 2,  Microsoft hired the team that had created the Beast, now operating independently as 42 Entertainment.  The result, I Love Bees, departed radically from the website-hunting and puzzle-solving that had been the focus of the Beast.  I Love Bees wove together an interactive narrative set in 2004, and a War Of The Worlds-style radio drama set in the future, the latter of which was broken into 30- to 60-second segments and broadcast over ringing payphones worldwide.  The game pushed players outdoors to answer phones, create and submit content, and recruit others, and received as much or more mainstream notice than its predecessor, finding its way onto television during a presidential debate,  and becoming one of The New York Times catchphrases of 2004. A slew of imitators, fan tributes and parodies followed.

The following spring, Audi launched The Art of the Heist to promote its new A3.  
Roughly a year after I Love Bees, 42 Entertainment produced Last Call Poker, a promotion for Activision's video game Gun.  Designed to help modern audiences connect with the Western genre, Last Call Poker centered around a working poker site, held games of "Tombstone Hold 'Em" in cemeteries around the United States—as well as in at least one digital venue, World of Warcraft's own virtual reality cemetery—and sent players to their own local cemeteries to clean up neglected grave sites and perform other tasks.

The 2005 videogame Advent Rising had a brief foray into the world of ARGs by launching the "Race to Save Mankind," which would reward the first person to find all hidden symbols within the game $1,000,000. This was later changed to winning several copies of the game instead due to technical issues. 

At the end of 2005, the International Game Developers Association ARG Special Interest Group was formed "to bring together those already designing, building, and running ARGs, in order to share knowledge, experience, and ideas for the future".

2005–2006: The rise of the self-supporting ARG 

As the genre has grown, there has been increasing interest in exploring models that provide funding for large-scale ARGs that are neither promotions for other products or limited by the generally small budget of grassroots/indie games.  The two major trends that have emerged in this area are support through the sale of products related to the game, and fees for participation in the game.  A third possible model is one using in-game advertising for other products, as in The LOST Experience, but at this time no large-scale game has attempted to fund itself solely through in-game advertising.

The first major attempt (other than EA's failed Majestic) to create a self-supporting ARG was Perplex City, which launched in 2005 after a year's worth of teasers.  The ARG offered a $200,000 prize to the first player to locate the buried Receda Cube and was funded by the sale of puzzle cards.  The first season of the game ended in January 2007, when Andy Darley found the Receda Cube at Wakerly Great Wood in Northamptonshire, UK.  Mind Candy, the production company, has also produced a board game related to the ARG and plans to continue it with a second season beginning March 1, 2007.  Whether the model was a success is unknown at this time, although Mind Candy's acceptance of corporate sponsorship and venture capital suggests that the puzzle cards alone are not enough to fully fund the ARG at this time.

In March 2006, Elan Lee and Dawne Weisman founded edoc laundry, a company designed to produce ARGs using clothes as the primary platform.  Consumers decipher the codes hidden within the garments and input the results into the game's main website to reveal pieces of a story about the murder of a band manager.

Reviving the pay-to-play model, Studio Cypher launched the first chapter of its "multiplayer novel" in May 2006.  Each "chapter" is a mini-ARG for which participants who pay the $10 registration fee receive earlier access to information and greater opportunities to interact with characters than non-paying participants.  VirtuQuest, a well-known corporate team, also attempted a pay-to-play model with Township Heights later in the year, but despite initial enthusiasm on the part of the ARG community, the game was not well-received due to the design team's use of player Hybrid-Names based on their real life names. Also the short run time frame was not appreciated by some seasoned players.

In June 2006, Catching the Wish launched from an in-game website about comic books based on its predecessor, 2003's Chasing the Wish.  42 Entertainment released Cathy's Book, by Sean Stewart and Jordan Weisman, in October 2006, shifting the central medium of this ARG from the internet to the printed page.  The young-adult novel contains an "evidence packet" and expands its universe through websites and working phone numbers, but is also a stand-alone novel that essentially functions as an individually playable ARG.  Neither the cost of creating the book nor sales figures are available (although it made both American and British bestseller lists) to determine whether the project was successfully self-funded.

It is difficult to judge the efficacy of self-funded ARG models at this time, but it seems likely that exploration of ways to fund large-scale ARGs without using them as marketing for other products will continue as the genre grows.

2006 onward: New developments 

2006 produced less large-scale corporate ARGs than past years, but the ARG form continued to spread and be adapted for promotional uses, as an increasing number of TV shows and movies extended their universes onto the internet through such means as character blogs and ARG-like puzzle trails, and as an increasing number of independent/grassroots games launched, with varying levels of success.   lonelygirl15, a popular series of videos on YouTube, relinquished an unprecedented amount of control to its audience by recognizing a fan-created game as the "official" ARG.

2007 got off to a strong start immediately, with Microsoft's Vanishing Point to promote the launch of Windows Vista. The game was designed by 42 Entertainment and, due in part to many large-scale real world events, such as a lavish show at the Bellagio Fountain in Las Vegas as well as a prizes of a trip into space and having a winner's name engraved on all AMD Athlon 64 FX chips for a certain period of time, received large media attention. It was followed almost immediately by a promotion, also rumored to be a 42 Entertainment production, for the release of the Nine Inch Nails album Year Zero, in which fans discovered leaked songs on thumb drives in washrooms at concerts.   Monster Hunter Club, a promotion for the U.S. release of the movie The Host, launched by sending action figures and other items to prominent members of the ARG community.  Perplex City concluded its first season by awarding a $200,000 prize to a player who found the game's missing cube.

Television tie-ins and "extended experiences"

Even before the development of the ARG genre, television sought to extend the reality of its shows onto the web with websites that treated the world as real, rather than discussing it as fiction.  An early example was Fox's Freakylinks, developed by Haxan, creators of the Blair Witch Project, who would later go on to develop the well-known ARGs The Art of the Heist and Who Is Benjamin Stove.  Freakylinks employed a website designed to look like it had been created by amateur paranormal enthusiasts to generate internet interest in the show, which gathered a cult following but was canceled after 13 episodes.  In September 2002, following a successful initial foray into ARG-like territory with 2001's Alias web game, ABC brought alternate reality gaming more definitively to the television screen with the show Push, Nevada. Produced by Ben Affleck and Matt Damon, the show created a fictional city in Nevada, named Push. When advertising the show, they advertised the city instead, with billboards, news reports, company sponsors, and other realistic life-intruding forms. During each episode of the show, highly cryptic clues would be revealed on screen, while other hidden clues could be found on the city's website. Unfortunately, the show was cancelled mid-season, and all of the remaining clues were released to the public. Clever watchers eventually figured out that the show would still be paying out its $1 million prize during Monday Night Football. The last clue was revealed during half-time, prompting those fortunate enough to have solved the puzzle to call a telephone number. The first person to call received $1 million.  In October 2004, the ReGenesis Extended Reality game launched in tandem with the Canadian television series ReGenesis.  Clues and stories from the series sent players online to stop a bioterrorist attack.

In 2006, the TV tie-in ARG began to come into its own when there was a surge of ARGs that extended the worlds of related television shows onto the internet and into the real world.  As with Push, Nevada, ABC led the way, launching three TV tie-in ARGs in 2006: Kyle XY, Ocular Effect (for the show Fallen) and The LOST Experience (for the show LOST).  ABC joined with Channel 4 in the UK and Australia's Channel 7 in promoting a revamped web site for The Hanso Foundation. The site was focused on a fictitious company prevalent in the storyline of the TV series, and the game was promoted through television advertisements run during LOST episodes.  Ocular Effect was launched in collaboration with Xenophile Media and Double Twenty Productions.

NBC followed suit in January 2007, beginning an ARG for its hit TV series Heroes
launched through an in-game reference to the website for Primatech Paper, a company from the show, which turned out to be real.  Text messages and emails led players who applied for "employment" at the site to secret files on the show's characters.

See also
 List of alternate reality games

References 

Alternate reality games
Immersive entertainment
Transmedia storytelling